The Boys' 400 metres at the 2009 World Youth Championships in Athletics was held at the Brixen-Bressanone Sport Arena on 8, 9, and 10 July. The event was won by Kirani James of Grenada, who also won the 200 metres.

Medalists

Records 
Prior to the competition, the following records were as follows.

Kirani James set a new Championship Record and World Youth Leading in the final.

Heats 
Qualification rule: first 2 of each heat (Q) plus the 4 fastest times (q) qualified.

Semifinals 
Qualification rule: first 2 of each heat (Q) plus the 2 fastest times (q) qualified.

Heat 1 

Key:  PB = Personal best, SB = Seasonal best

Heat 2 

Key:  PB = Personal best, SB = Seasonal best

Heat 3 

Key:  PB = Personal best, SB = Seasonal best

Final 

Key:  PB = Personal best, SB = Seasonal best, CR = Championship record, WYL = World Youth Leading

References 

World Youth Championships 2009

2009 World Youth Championships in Athletics